The 2015 TCR Asia Series season was the first season of the TCR Asia Series. The season began at Sepang on 5 September and finished on 22 November at the Guia Circuit in Macau, after four rounds.

Michael Choi won the drivers' championship, driving a Honda Civic TCR, and Asia Racing Team won the teams' championship.

Teams and drivers
Michelin is the official tyre supplier.

Calendar and results
The provisional 2015 schedule was announced on 23 December 2014. A revised calendar was announced on 25 February 2015. On 17 July the Zhuhai round, scheduled for 16 August, was removed.

Championship standings

Drivers' championship

† – Drivers did not finish the race, but were classified as they completed over 75% of the race distance.

Teams' Championship

† – Drivers did not finish the race, but were classified as they completed over 75% of the race distance.

References

External links
 

TCR Asia Series
TCR Asia Series season